Terrance is a given name. Notable people with the name include:

People
Terrance Brennan, American chef and restaurateur
Terrance Carroll (born 1969), American lawyer, minister, Speaker of the Colorado House of Representatives
Terrance Cauthen (born 1976), American boxer
Terrance Christopher, OMM, LVO, CD, retired Canadian Naval Officer, former Usher of the Black Rod for the Senate of Canada
Terrance Copper (born 1982), American football wide receiver for the Kansas City Chiefs
Terrance John Cox, also known as TJ Cox (born 1963), American engineer and politician
Terrance Dean Black American Writer
Terrance Dicks (1935–2019), English writer, best known for his work in TV and children's books
Terrance Dotsy (born 1981), American football player
Terrance T. Etnyre, United States Vice Admiral
Terrance W. Gainer (born 1947), the 38th and current Sergeant at Arms of the United States Senate
Terrance Hayes (born 1971), prize-winning poet, born in Columbia, South Carolina
Terrance Hobbs (born 1970), lead guitarist in the New York Death Metal band Suffocation
Terrance Knighton (born 1986), American football defensive tackle for the Jacksonville Jaguars
Terrance B. Lettsome (1935–2007), politician (main British Virgin Islands airport is named after him)
Terrance Lindall (born 1944), American artist who was born in Minneapolis, Minnesota
Terrance Odean, professor of banking and finance at the Haas School of Business, University of California, Berkeley
Terrance Parks (born 1990), American football player
Terrance Pennington (born 1983), American football guard and offensive tackle for the New York Giants
Terrance Roberson (born 1976), American professional basketball player
Terrance Shaw (born 1973), played as a cornerback in many teams
Terrance Simien (born 1965), American zydeco musician, vocalist and songwriter
Terrance Simmons (born 1976), former American football defensive tackle
Terrance Taylor (American football) (born 1986), American football defensive tackle for the Indianapolis Colts
Terrance Thomas (born 1980), American professional basketball player
Terrance Zdunich, American actor, writer, composer, and storyboard artist

Fictional characters
Terrance "Terry" Hawthorne, a character in the 1985 American adventure comedy film Pee-wee's Big Adventure
Terrance Henry Stoot, Canadian surgeon and comedian from Toronto in the American animated sitcom South Park

See also
Terance, given name
Terence (given name)